Brian Joseph Yale (born November 14, 1968) is an American musician who is the bass guitarist for the band Matchbox Twenty and has been nominated for four Grammy Awards.

Early life and education
Yale grew up in Orange, Connecticut. He graduated from Amity Regional High School (in Woodbridge, CT) in 1987 where he participated in a school band. After high school, he attended Berklee School of Music for one year. He then transferred to University of Miami, graduating a Bachelor of Music in 1993. After college he attended and graduated the audio engineering program at Full Sail University.

Career
Before joining Matchbox Twenty, he was a member of the band Tabitha's Secret with Rob Thomas and Paul Doucette.

References

1968 births
20th-century American musicians
21st-century American musicians
Alternative rock bass guitarists
American alternative rock musicians
American rock bass guitarists
American male bass guitarists
APRA Award winners
Living people
Matchbox Twenty members
Musicians from Orlando, Florida
Guitarists from Florida
American male guitarists
20th-century American guitarists